Tootsie's Cabaret Miami is a large adult entertainment club in Miami Gardens, a suburb of Miami in northern Miami-Dade County, Florida. The club, located in a two-story, 74,000-square-foot building formerly used as a distribution center, is considered the largest strip club in the United States.

History 
Tootsie's Cabaret opened in 1993 as a small club in Miami Gardens. In 2006, the club moved to a building that formerly housed a BJ's distribution center on a 14-acre site at 150 Northwest 183rd Street in Miami Gardens. The building near the corner of Highway 441 and Miami Gardens Drive has an indoor parking garage with a private VIP entrance.

In 2007 a subsidiary of RCI Hospitality Holdings Inc. acquired Tootsie's Cabaret for $25 million. In 2015 a Subsidiary of RCI Hospitality Holding purchased the building, plaza and warehouse Tootsie's resides in.

The venue layout includes four full liquor bars, three stages with a 400-square-foot main stage, champagne suites, spacious sky boxes, a restaurant and large sports bar.

Tootsie's is known for its private entrance used by celebrities and professional sports players. Sports athletes and other celebrities are known to frequent to make it rain and enjoy the Lobster Tail and Lemon Pepper wings.

On March 1, 2022, RCI announced Tootsie’s was one of the first of RCI’s subsidiaries to accept Bitcoin as payment.

Covid-19 curfew controversy 
In October 2020 Tootsie's Cabaret sued Miami-Dade County over the 12:00 midnight curfew it had imposed on bars and clubs as a means of limiting the spread of Covid-19. Tootsies argued the county's curfew conflicted with governor Ron DeSantis's order which prohibited local governments from imposing Covid-related strictures on businesses. The judge in the case granted a temporary restraining order in favor of Tootsie's which overruled the curfew and allowed Miami-Dade businesses to operate past midnight. The county filed an appeal and eventually reinstated the curfew.

In popular culture
Music artist Drake in the 2015 track "Back to Back" mentioned Tootsie's in the lyrics, "I mean whoa, can't fool the city, man, they know what's up, second floor at Tootsie's, getting shoulder rubs". Miami music artist Pitbull mentions Tootsie's in his 2012 Global Warming album. I'm off that, "Scarlett's, Tootsies, I love that." Time Out magazine lists Tootsie's Cabaret as a top strip club destination in Miami. Thrillist lists Tootsie's Cabaret as the best Strip Club to Watch a Game.

On December 2, 2021, contemporary artist Todd Gray, as part of Miami's famed Art Week, body-painted a dancer and previewed recent original pieces of artwork at Tootsie's.

Awards 
 Miami New Times – Best Strip Club 2006
 Miami New Times – Best Strip Club Miami 2015
 Annual ED's Adult Nightclub and Exotic Dancer Awards Show – Overall Club of The Year 2015
 Miami New Times – Best Strip Club Miami 2019

See also
 List of strip clubs

References

External links 
 Tootsies Cabaret website

Strip clubs in the United States
Entertainment companies of the United States
Companies based in Miami-Dade County, Florida
Adult entertainment companies
Publicly traded companies
Entertainment companies established in 1993
American companies established in 1993
1993 establishments in Florida